St. George's Church is a ruined church in Brataj, Vlorë County, Albania. It is a Cultural Monument of Albania.

References

Cultural Monuments of Albania
Buildings and structures in Selenicë
Church ruins in Albania
Churches in Vlorë County